James Blair Cunningham (born 1952) is an American diplomat who served as the United States Ambassador to Afghanistan. Cunningham has served in various diplomatic positions, including Chief of Staff to NATO Secretary General Manfred Woerner (1989–1990), Deputy Advisor for Political Affairs at the United States Mission to the United Nations (1990–1992), Director of the State Department's Office of European Security and Political Affairs (1993-1995), Deputy Chief of Mission, Embassy of the United States in Rome  (1996–2001), Acting United States Ambassador to the United Nations (2001), Consul General of the United States to Hong Kong and Macau (2005-2008) and the United States Ambassador to Israel (2008–2011).

Early life and education 
Cunningham was born in Allentown, Pennsylvania. He graduated magna cum laude from the Maxwell School of Citizenship and Public Affairs at Syracuse University in 1974, with degrees in political science and psychology.

Career 
He has served as the Deputy Chief of Mission, Embassy of the United States in Rome before becoming an ambassador to the United Nations. He has spent most of his career working on European political and security issues, and in multilateral diplomacy.

He served from 1989 to 1990 as Chief of Staff to NATO Secretary General Manfred Woerner. His responsibilities included advising the Secretary General on the entire range of NATO issues in the context of the dissolution of the Warsaw Pact and the Soviet Union.

Cunningham became Deputy Advisor for Political Affairs at the United States Mission to the United Nations in August 1990, just after the Iraqi invasion of Kuwait. He returned to Washington, D.C., as Deputy Director of the State Department's Office of European Security and Political Affairs in 1992, becoming Director in 1993. As Director, he was involved in many aspects of U.S. policy toward Europe, including NATO, arms control and disarmament, and Bosnia. After a year of senior officer development training, he took up his duties in Rome in August 1996.

As Consul General, (from 2005–2008) Cunningham was responsible for Hong Kong and Macau, both special administrative regions of the People's Republic of China. He is known in Chinese as 郭明瀚 Guō Mínghàn.

Cunningham became the Chairman of the Committee for Freedom in Hong Kong (CFHK) in 2021. CFHK is a US-based non-profit organisation, which presses for the preservation of freedom, democracy, and international law in Hong Kong.

Personal life 
He is married to Leslie Genier of Mineville, New York. The couple have two daughters, Emma and Abigail.

Awards and honors
  U.S. State Department Superior Honor Award
  U.S. State Department Meritorious Honor Award
 National Performance Review's Hammer Award

References

External links 

|-

|-

|-

1952 births
Ambassadors of the United States to Afghanistan
Ambassadors of the United States to Israel
Living people
People from Allentown, Pennsylvania
Permanent Representatives of the United States to the United Nations
Maxwell School of Citizenship and Public Affairs alumni
Consuls general of the United States in Hong Kong and Macau
21st-century American diplomats